Mollavazlı (also, Mollavaizly) is a village and municipality in the Saatly Rayon of Azerbaijan. It has a population of 1,602.

References 

Populated places in Saatly District